Rawat is a town and union council of the Islamabad Capital Territory in Pakistan. During Sikh rule in the Punjab, it was a fortified town which was used for Sikh caravans passing by on their way to Peshawar or Attock. This town was also captured by the invading British army who had just captured Gujrat from the retreating Sikhs. The Sikhs finally surrendered the city of Rawalpindi and their empire to the British.

External links
http://ictunioncouncil.blogspot.com/

References

Union councils of Islamabad Capital Territory